Cláudio André Santos Assis, better known as Claudinho (born May 7, 1982) is a Brazilian footballer.

Biography
After playing for RC Strasbourg as a junior, he went on to Atlético Paranaense before being signed by Australian A-League club Melbourne Victory for the 2006–07 season. 

Despite arriving in Australia with the greatest reputation of the Trio from Rio (Claudinho, Alessandro and Fred) he failed to make an impact. He scored on debut in Round 1 but made just four more appearances and only two days after the Melbourne Victory were crowned 2006–07 minor Premiers, Claudinho had his contract mutually terminated by the club. 

He cited family reasons and being unable to settle into Melbourne as the main reasons his contract was terminated, he returned to Brazil shortly after, joining Esporte Clube Santo André.

References
 Profile
 Boys From Brazil

1982 births
Living people
A-League Men players
Brazilian footballers
Brazilian expatriate footballers
Club Athletico Paranaense players
Melbourne Victory FC players
Expatriate soccer players in Australia

Association football midfielders